Árni Þór Árnason (born 15 January 1961) is an Icelandic alpine skier. He competed in two events at the 1984 Winter Olympics.

References

1961 births
Living people
Icelandic male alpine skiers
Olympic alpine skiers of Iceland
Alpine skiers at the 1984 Winter Olympics
Sportspeople from Reykjavík
20th-century Icelandic people